William O'Brien (June 25, 1782 – September 23, 1851) was a political figure in Nova Scotia. He represented Hants County from 1820 to 1826 and from 1834 to 1836 in the Nova Scotia House of Assembly.

He was born in Noel, Nova Scotia, the son of Isaac O'Brien and Mary Denny. In 1807, he married Jane F. Johnson. In 1809, he married Ann Putnam. He died in Noel at the age of 69.

References 
 A Directory of the Members of the Legislative Assembly of Nova Scotia, 1758-1958, Public Archives of Nova Scotia (1958)

1782 births
1854 deaths
Nova Scotia pre-Confederation MLAs